Kairi Himanen (born 11 November 1992) is an Estonian footballer who plays as a midfielder for Naiste Meistriliiga club Saku Sporting.

She has represented the Estonia women's national football team at youth and senior level.

References

External links

1992 births
Living people
Estonian women's footballers
Women's association football midfielders
Estonia women's international footballers
Pärnu JK players